Khoshuiyeh (also Romanized as Khoshū’īyeh and Khoshū’īeh; also known as Khowshū’īyeh and Zard Khoshū’īyeh) is a village in Cham Rud Rural District, Bagh-e Bahadoran District, Lenjan County, Isfahan Province, Iran. At the 2006 census, its population was 193, in 56 families.

References 

Populated places in Lenjan County